John Carey is an Irish sportswriter and columnist for national and international Irish newspapers.

Biography
Previously a producer and director at the R.M.A.S.D. and later the head of News and Current Affairs at 96FM, Carey worked for 10 years as head columnist for The Irish World Newspaper based in London. Carey is a columnist for several newspapers, includingThe Irish Post and Irish in Britain.  He is senior editor for the Cara News company www.cara.news.freeservers.com.

References

1960 births
Living people
Journalists from Glasgow